Edmund and George (or Edmund & George), was launched on the Thames River in 1788 as a West Indiaman. Then in 1796 she made one voyage to Bengal for the British East India Company (EIC). The French captured her while she was homeward bound.

Edmund and George appears in the 1789 issue of Lloyd's Register with T. Rainey, master, J. Christie, owner, and trade London—St Kitts.

Lloyd's Register for 1796 shows her master as J. Findlay, changing to T. Mead, and her owner as Bridgeman, changing to J. Annen & Co. Her trade is London—Jamaica, changing to London—India.

Edmund and George sailed for Bengal on 11 August 1796. Her master was T. Meed, or T. Mead. As she was returning to England from Bengal the French captured her. The EIC valued the cargo it had lost in Edmund and Georges capture at £6,100.

Citations and references
Citations

References

‘Reports from the Select Committee of the House of Commons appointed to enquire into the present state of the affairs of the East India Company, together with the minutes of evidence, an appendix of documents, and a general index,  (1830).

1788 ships
Ships built in Rotherhithe
Age of Sail merchant ships of England
Ships of the British East India Company
Captured ships